This is a list of members of the 110th United States Congress who have served in the United States military, including active duty, reserve, or National Guard components of the United States Army, the United States Navy, the United States Marine Corps, the United States Air Force, or the United States Coast Guard.

As of March 2020, this list is incomplete.

Out of 100 senators, 24 have served in the United States military.

Military service
110th United States Congress members
Military
110th United States Congress members